Factory-to-consumer (F2C) describes commerce transactions between a manufacturer and a consumer.  Contrasting terms are business-to-business (B2B) and business-to-consumer (B2C).

Consumers can (individual or in group) buy large quantities directly from the factory. For example, large private constructions or events.

See also
 Business-to-business
 Business-to-consumer
 Business-to-employee
 Center for E-Commerce Infrastructure Development
 Consumer-to-consumer
 E-business
 E-Business XML (ebXML)
 Electronic Commerce
 Electronic Data Interchange (EDI)
 Online shopping
 Private Electronic Market
 UN/CEFACT's Modeling Methodology (UMM)
 B2B e-Marketplace

Distribution (marketing)